Mimmo Cuticchio (born 30 March 1948) is an Italian cantastorie, puppeteer, actor and playwright.

Life and career 
Born in Gela, the son of Giacomo, a puppeteer who had a travelling theatre, Cuticchio inherited the family legacy and in 1973 founded the Teatro dei Pupi Santa Rosalia, an Opera dei Pupi in Palermo. The same year he wrote his first cantastoria play, Giuseppe Balsamo conte di Cagliostro. In 1977 he founded the association and stage company "Figli D'Arte Cuticchio". 

During his career Cuticchio focused on renewing the arts of Opera dei Pupi and cantastoria, opening them to contemporary themes and to civil commitments. As an actor, he appeared in several films, notably playing a leading role in Emanuele Crialese's Terraferma. In 2022, he received a honorary degree from Roma Tre University.

References

External links 

1948 births
Living people
People from Gela
Italian film actors
Italian stage actors
Puppeteers